Marcianos vs. Mexicanos is a 2018 Mexican adult animated science fiction comedy film produced, written, and directed by Gabriel Riva Palacio Alatriste and Rodolfo Riva Palacio Alatriste. The film features the voices of Adal Ramones, Martha Higareda,
Omar Chaparro, Angélica Vale, Eduardo Manzano, and Jaime Maussan. Produced by Huevocartoon Producciones (best known for the Huevos franchise), it is the company's first original project as it features an entirely human cast and original story, in contrast to the company's previous feature films, and in a similar way to its internet shorts. The film is aimed for a mature audience.

The film was released in Mexico on March 9, 2018, opening to negative critical reception and a box-office disappointment.

It has been made available on digital platforms via Pantaya in the United States.

Plot
A Mexican family was chosen by NASA to head to Mars in order to stop an army of Martians from conquering Earth.

Cast
Adal Ramones as El Chacas
Martha Higareda as La Zafiro
Omar Chaparro as the Martian king
Angélica Vale as La Tlacoyito 
Eduardo Manzano as Don Calcáneo
Ricardo Hill as El Teacher
Humberto Vélez as El General
Fernando Meza as El Nene / Doña Chocho / El Cubano / Juan
Mónica Santacruz Gutiérrez as La Joselyn
Rodolfo Riva Palacio Alatriste as El Talachas / El Poli / El Mirey / Martian Soldier
Gabriel Riva Palacio Alatriste as Jacinto / El Frijol / La Niña / El Chino / Nerd
Jaime Maussan as himself

Production

Development
The film has been in development from 2015 to 2017. The film's directors and producers Gabriel and Rodolfo Riva Palacio Alatriste said the film is a setback to the foundation of their production company, Huevocartoon Producciones, due to the company's "irreverent" and "rude" content nature. "When we started with Huevocartoon[,] we were kind of a Latin South Park, but then when we made the films[,] we had to reach another audience[.] [N]ow it will have a scratchy side," said Gabriel. Gabriel also mentioned the idea of the story is based on the real-life economic problems occurring in Mexico, and how the citizens in the film were "immune" to the Martians. "One day[,] my brother (Rodolfo) and I were talking about how the country was bad in every way: corruption, politics, everything, we told ourselves that something very big must happen to create awareness," said Gabriel. "We began to present the script and suddenly[,] this happened: [...]everything we suffer would make us immune to Martians, and NASA even sends a mission to Mexico." Adal Ramones, who portrays protagonist 'El Chacas', shared more details on the economic issues of the country and how the characters in the film would not save Earth in a traditional formula. "On this occasion, we are going to face the Martians, [and] they see that Godzilla or the aliens always arrive and attack New York[,] and it is the gringos who stop the world catastrophe[.] Well, now we Mexicans are responsible for saving the world and we do not do it precisely with a prepared army or the best technology in arms, but with their irreverent way of being and solving the lawsuits," said Ramones. "Wrestling, tacos, Mexicans who steal motherships to sell their mechanical parts on the black market, things like that are what we see and those that give more laughter, because the Riva Palacio took the 'bad' of the country and used it to [...] fight against an alien invasion [that] we see [the] stereotypes of the Mexican in different characters, from the corrupt policeman to the luchona mother." Co-director and writer, Rodolfo Riva is very satisfied with the film, to which he says that "it's a film I made with a lot of heart."

Casting
The voice cast consists of well-known Mexican talent, to which some have shared their satisfaction and call it "funny".

Adal Ramones, who plays the main protagonist 'El Chacas', calls the project "a very funny animated film" as the film is his first effort in an adult-themed animated production. "My character is called (or nicknamed) 'Chacas', and he's literally a neighborhood boy who along with other people who represent various stereotypes of the Mexican, are recruited to fight against the aliens that have already invaded the entire world, except our country," said Ramones. "It's a very funny animated film because it's the first time I've seen a production of this kind in comedy that is not for children, but for teenagers and adults really because it's very funny, very picaresque and a portrait of how we Mexicans are." The Mexican actor had previous voice-acting experience in other animated films, such as the Spanish-language version of Pixar's A Bug's Life, and Animex's El Americano.

Actress Martha Higareda, who voices 'El Zafiro', stated she is very satisfied with her voice work in the film, saying that she is "proud" to be in a film produced by Huevocartoon, a company in which she praised the filmmakers for achievement to revive the Mexican animation industry, which was not common in the country's film industry. For her role, she had to change her voice to a 'smoother'-like to match the 'sexy' trait of her character. "I had to change because I have [a] very sharp[,] and [for] 'Zafiro's voice[,] I demanded something much more dense," said Higareda. Higareda has had previous voice work experience in the Spanish dub version of Warner Bros.' Storks, La Leyenda de la Nahuala, and a guest role in Cartoon Network's Steven Universe. "I really enjoyed it, I had to do it with Storks[.] I hope that Marcianos vs. Mexicanos is one more I can do, said Higareda.

Angélica Vale, who voices 'La Tlacoyito', have also shared her 'satisfying' experience with working with the filmmakers. Vale had previously collaborated with the past productions by Huevocartoon. "My love for the Riva Palacio is something much stronger than anything. I think they are two very talented guys and how could I say no? I flattered and happy that they give chance to return to be with them in a movie no longer [in] Huevos but as the 'Tlacoyito'.

Other talents include Omar Chaparro, who previously collaborated with Huevocartoon for Un gallo con muchos huevos, Eduardo Manzano, and ufologist Jaime Maussan, among others.

Animation
The film is produced with 2D traditional animation using Toon Boom Harmony software.

Release
The film premiered in theaters in Mexico on March 9, 2018.

Reception
Box office
The film opened at #4 on its opening weekend in Mexico, earning $13.5 million pesos (US$0.7 million).

Critical response
Upon its release, the film has received negative reviews from critics, to which some criticized the film's plot and humor; others praised its political impact approach. It has a 9% "Rotten" rating on the review aggregator website Tomatazos, a Mexican localized version of Rotten Tomatoes.

Awards and nominations
 

See alsoUna Película de HuevosOtra Película de Huevos y un PolloUn gallo con muchos huevos''

References

External links

Videocine profile (in Spanish)

2010s adventure comedy films
2010s science fiction adventure films
2010s science fiction comedy films
2018 animated films
2018 comedy films
2018 films
2018 LGBT-related films
2018 science fiction films
Alien invasions in fiction
Alien invasions in films
Animated comedy films
Films about astronauts
Films about corruption
Films about NASA
Films set in Mexico
Films with live action and animation
Gay-related films
LGBT-related science fiction comedy films
Mars in film
Mexican animated films
Mexican LGBT-related films
Mexican political satire films
Mexican science fiction comedy films
Mexican science fiction adventure films
2010s Mexican films
Adult animated comedy films